Discinisca is a genus of brachiopods with fossils dating back from the Early Devonian to the Pliocene of Africa, Europe, North America, and New Zealand.

Living individuals incorporate tablets of silica into their shell.

References

 Fossils (Smithsonian Handbooks) by David Ward (Page 92)
 Emig, Christian (2006). Systematics of extant brachiopod taxa

External links
Discinisca in the Paleobiology Database

Discinida
Devonian brachiopods
Carboniferous brachiopods
Permian brachiopods
Triassic brachiopods
Jurassic brachiopods
Cretaceous brachiopods
Paleocene animals
Eocene animals
Oligocene animals
Miocene animals
Pliocene animals
Prehistoric animals of Africa
Prehistoric animals of Europe
Prehistoric animals of North America
Early Devonian first appearances
Pliocene extinctions
Prehistoric brachiopod genera